Mohamad Jemuri bin Serjan (10 September 1929 – 26 January 2022) was a Malaysian judge who served as the last Chief Justice of Borneo and the first Chief Judge of Sabah and Sarawak.

Life and career 
Jemuri was born on 10 September 1929 to Serjan Wakijan and Jede Othman in Kuching. After graduating from school, Jemuri joined the Education Department as an uncertified teacher and taught at the Madrasah Melayu. In 1955, he was transferred to serve in the Sarawak administrative service where he had his first encounter with law and legal work.

On 1 June 1965, Jemuri became a stipendiary magistrate. He was then appointed assistant Attorney-General of Sarawak on 8 November 1966. In 1973, Jemuri was promoted as Attorney-General (A-G) and held that office until his retirement in 1984. It was during his period in office that the infamous 1966 Sarawak constitutional crisis took place which resulted in the removal of Stephen Kalong Ningkan as Chief Minister of Sarawak. However, he was later re-engaged on a contract basis and continued serving as A-G until 31 December 1989, following which he was appointed a judge of the Supreme Court of Malaysia. Finally, Jemuri was appointed the Chief Justice of Borneo on 11 March 1991, an office which he held until shortly after it was renamed the Chief Judge of Sabah and Sarawak before his retirement on 9 September 1994.

Jemuri died at a hospital in Kuching on 26 January 2022, at the age of 92.

Honours 
  :
  Companion of the Order of the Defender of the Realm (JMN) (1975)
  Commander of the Order of the Defender of the Realm (PMN) - Tan Sri (1992)

  :
  Grand Commander of the Order of Kinabalu (SPDK) - Datuk Seri Panglima (1994)

  :
  Distinguished Service Medal-Gold (PPC)
  Companion of the Order of the Star of Sarawak (JBS)
  Knight Commander of the Order of the Star of Sarawak (PNBS) - Dato Sri
  Knight Commander of the Order of the Star of Hornbill Sarawak (DA) - Datuk Amar (1992)

See also 
 1966 Sarawak constitutional crisis

References 

1929 births
2022 deaths
20th-century Malaysian judges
People from Sarawak
People from Kuching
Malaysian people of Malay descent
Malaysian Muslims
Commanders of the Order of the Defender of the Realm
Companions of the Order of the Defender of the Realm
Knights Commander of the Order of the Star of Hornbill Sarawak
Grand Commanders of the Order of Kinabalu
Knights Commander of the Most Exalted Order of the Star of Sarawak